Burns Square Historic District is a historic district located in Sarasota, Florida, United States. The area runs from Ringling Boulevard to Mound Avenue along South Pineapple and South Orange Avenues. Burns Square is bound by Laurel Park Historic District to the east, Palm Avenue residential neighborhood to the west, and Hudson Bayou to the south.

History
In 1925, Owen Burns developed and built the Burns Court subdivision in the area, designed by architect Thomas Reed Martin. The Burns Court Historic District was designation by the National Park Service in 1984. The cottages of Burns Court subdivision were located at 400-446 Burns Court and 418, 426, and 446 S. Pineapple Ave. This historic street is located one to three blocks to the northwest of the Pineapple Apartments site.

Between 1925 and 1929, the landscape of this district changed drastically. In 1925, the Sanborn Insurance Map showed no structures on the triangular property at S. Orange and S. Pineapple Avenues. Across the street on S. Orange Avenue, the only structure was a single-family residence and garage. The Seaboard Air Line Railway went from Lemon Avenue down Pineapple, and by 1929, the neighborhood was developed. The Herald Tribune showed photos of its new business home in its December 15, 1926 edition, complete with advertising and business offices, a pressroom, and linotype and composing rooms, which opened on October 4, 1925. Also, a two-page segment ran with the headline, "The Ringling-Burns Interests Have Shown Their Faith." In addition to photographs of the El Vernona Hotel, The Broadway Apartments, and the Colson Hotel for "the colored population and colored tourists." The surrounding area became known as Herald Square after the Sarasota Herald building was completed across Orange Avenue that same year.

Owen Burns built the Pineapple Apartments at a cost of $75,000. The design for the triangle began in the New York offices of architect Dwight James Baum. In 1924, Baum discovered Sarasota, and after meeting Owen Burns, determined that he wanted to recreate the architecture he had seen in Europe and the Mediterranean. The building had seven apartments on the second floor. Stores occupied the first floor, including Tee Gee, a five-and-dime type shop, and Freeman's Drugs, a drugstore operated by Clarence and Nellie Freeman.

In 1950, Paul Rudolph, from the Sarasota School of Architecture, designed a modern addition containing 18 one-bedroom apartments, with additional retail space on the ground floor also added to the triangle building. The 1960 City Directory reflects that the Sarasota Herald-Tribune had by this time moved to 801 S. Tamiami Trail, and Privett's Drugs was at 1605 Third Street with a new owner.

In 1986, Denise Kowal bought the triangle building and its 1950's addition to save it from demolition by speculators who wanted to build a high-rise on the property. She made extensive interior and exterior renovations. A cupola, wrought iron balconies, awnings, and tile address signs were also added. Three of the original studio apartments were converted to a single apartment that Kowal occupied with her two sons in 1996. In 1997, the residence was featured in the Sarasota Alliance for Historic Preservation annual Historic Homes Tour.

In 1999, the area was renamed Burns Square Historic District by the area stakeholders, replacing Herald Square, as an honor to Owen Burns and the history of this triangle shaped district.

References

External links
 Sarasota County listings at National Register of Historic Places

National Register of Historic Places in Sarasota County, Florida
Historic districts in Florida
Buildings and structures in Sarasota, Florida